José Antonio Rodríguez Fernández (Spain. José Antonio Rodríguez Fernández, 1915 — 1978) was a Cuban footballer.

International career
He represented Cuba at the 1938 FIFA World Cup in France. Rodríguez appeared in all three matches.

References

External links
 

Cuban footballers
1938 FIFA World Cup players
Cuba international footballers
Association football midfielders
1915 births
1975 deaths